Babiniec refers to the following places in Poland:

 Babiniec, Lesser Poland Voivodeship
 Babiniec, Łódź Voivodeship

See also 

 Babinec (disambiguation)